The Truth Is... is the fourth studio album by rock band Theory of a Deadman, released on July 12, 2011. The first single, "Lowlife", was released to radio stations on May 17, 2011. It went to number 1 on the US rock charts. It was co-written by Christine Danielle Connolly.

Critical reception 

The album received mostly negative reviews from critics. AllMusic, Rolling Stone and CNN all gave it 1/5 stars. Metacritic gave the album a 35 out of 100 based on five reviews.

Commercial performance 
In the United States, the album debuted at number 8 on the Billboard 200 chart selling 38,000 copies. On March 31, 2021, the RIAA certified the album Gold. In Canada, the album debuted at number 2 on the Canadian Albums Chart, selling 8,500 copies. This is an increase in sales from their previous album, Scars & Souvenirs, which sold 6,000 copies in its first week.

Track listing 
Track list adapted from AllMusic:

Personnel 
 Tyler Connolly – lead vocals, lead guitar
 Dave Brenner – rhythm guitar, vocals
 Dean Back – bass, vocals
 Joey Dandeneau – drums, percussion, vocals

Production
Howard Benson - producer
 Mike Plotnikoff - recording
 Hatsikazu "Hatch" Inagaki - engineer
Chris Lord-Alge - mixing
Ted Jensen - mastering at Sterling Sound, NYC, NY

Charts

Weekly charts

Year-end charts

Certifications

References 

2011 albums
Theory of a Deadman albums